Lipno is a municipality and village in Louny District in the Ústí nad Labem Region of the Czech Republic. It has about 600 inhabitants.

Administrative parts
Villages of Drahomyšl and Lipenec are administrative parts of Lipno.

References

Villages in Louny District